Susan Jane Backlinie (born September 1, 1946) is an American former actress and stuntwoman. She is known for her role as Chrissie Watkins, the first shark victim in Steven Spielberg's blockbuster Jaws (1975).

Personal life
Along with being a stuntwoman specializing in swimming work, she was an animal trainer. She currently works as a computer accountant in her home of Ventura, California.

Career
Backlinie's appearance in Jaws took three days to shoot, with Backlinie strapped into a harness while the crew struggled to get the desired effects. Contrary to rumor, Backlinie's startled reaction and screams of anguish were not due to her being injured by the harness that yanked her back and forth in the water. However, she was attached to a line that was anchored to the ocean floor beneath her, and she was intentionally not warned when she would be first pulled underwater; this helped provoke a more genuine expression of surprise from her initially – but the remainder of her performance was her own as an actress. When Jaws co-star Richard Dreyfuss saw a daily of her performance of being attacked by the shark, he told her it absolutely terrified him.

Backlinie also appears in Spielberg's film 1941 parodying her role in Jaws: instead of being attacked by a shark during a midnight swim, she's "picked up" by the periscope of a Japanese submarine. The scene has been described as the best joke in what is otherwise widely considered one of Spielberg's least successful films.

Backlinie also appeared in the 1977 film Day of the Animals, regarded by some as a Jaws clone about nature gone bad.

Filmography

Other
She appeared in her own pictorial ("The Lady and the Lion") in the January 1973 issue of Penthouse. This was more than a year before she submitted a nude photo of herself to the Jaws production executive who brought her to Spielberg's attention for the role of Chrissie. She also appeared nude in the February 1977 issue of Mayfair ("Susan Backlinie - The nude from Jaws", vol. 12, issue 2, pages 40–43).

References

External links

 
 

1946 births
Living people
American film actresses
American stunt performers
People from Ventura, California
20th-century American actresses
Actresses from California
21st-century American women